The Great Nicobar serpent eagle (Spilornis klossi), also known as the South Nicobar serpent eagle, is a species of bird of prey in the family Accipitridae. It is endemic to forest on the Indian island of Great Nicobar. It is threatened by habitat loss.

All major authorities now treat the Great Nicobar serpent eagle as a species, but in the past it was sometimes considered a subspecies of S. minimus. Today S. minimus is either considered a subspecies of the crested serpent eagle or a monotypic species from the central Nicobar Islands, the Central Nicobar serpent eagle.

References

 Ferguson-Lees & Christie (2001). Raptors of the World. Christopher Helm, London. 

Great Nicobar serpent eagle
Birds of the Nicobar Islands
Great Nicobar serpent eagle
Near threatened animals
Great Nicobar serpent eagle
Great Nicobar serpent eagle
Great Nicobar serpent eagle
Taxonomy articles created by Polbot
Endemic fauna of the Nicobar Islands